The Dunbar Islands are a small group of islands lying off Varna Peninsula southwest of Williams Point, the northeast extremity of Livingston Island in the South Shetland Islands, Antarctica comprising the islands of Aspis, Balsha, Melyane, Pogledets and Zavala, and several minor islets and rocks.  The area was visited by early 19th century sealers.

The islands are named after Captain Thomas Dunbar, Master of the American sealing schooner Free Gift which visited the South Shetland Islands in 1820–21.

Location 

Maps
 L.L. Ivanov et al. Antarctica: Livingston Island and Greenwich Island, South Shetland Islands. Scale 1:100000 topographic map. Sofia: Antarctic Place-names Commission of Bulgaria, 2005.
 L.L. Ivanov. Antarctica: Livingston Island and Greenwich, Robert, Snow and Smith Islands. Scale 1:120000 topographic map.  Troyan: Manfred Wörner Foundation, 2009.

See also 
 Composite Antarctic Gazetteer
 List of Antarctic islands south of 60° S
 SCAR
 Territorial claims in Antarctica

External links 
 SCAR Composite Antarctic Gazetteer.

Islands of the South Shetland Islands